José Eduardo de Araújo (born 16 August 1991), or simply Zé Eduardo, is a Brazilian footballer who last played as a defensive midfielder for Sandefjord. He can also play at full-back or on either wing, but sees central midfield as his strongest position.

Career
Zé Eduardo began his career in 2003 with Cruzeiro Esporte Clube. He made his debut in the last match of the 2008 Campeonato Brasileiro Série A, replacing Henrique in the final minutes.

In August 2009, Zé Eduardo joined Associação Maga Esporte Clube (which was effectively an investing company) for €500,000 and signed a 5-year contract. Maga held 75% of his transfer rights while Cruzeiro held the remaining 25%.

On 31 August 2009, he was loaned to AFC Ajax. On 9 June 2010, Ajax chose not to activate the option to buy Zé Eduardo, and he moved back to Associação Maga Esporte Clube.

In July 2010, he joined Italian Serie A side Parma on loan from Maga for €500,000 and was called up to pre-season camp. He was a member of its youth team, though was also awarded the number 22 shirt of the first team. He played in 2011 Torneo di Viareggio.

In July 2012, he joined Serie B side Padova on loan.

In August 2013, he moved to Greek club OFI Crete on loan.

In July 2014, Zé Eduardo joined Cesena for an undisclosed fee.

On 8 August 2015, Zé Eduardo joined S.S. Virtus Lanciano 1924 in a temporary deal.

On 10 March 2020, Zé Eduardo joined Sandefjord on a 1-year contract.

International career
Ze Eduardo is also former Brazil U-19 member and played for the Brazil national under-20 football team from 2009 to 2011. Dudu was formerly member of the U-16 of his homeland Brazil.

Honours

National Team
South American Youth Championship: 2009, 2011
Sendai Cup: 2008

References

External links
 
 
 

1991 births
Living people
Brazilian footballers
Brazil under-20 international footballers
Brazil youth international footballers
Brazilian expatriate footballers
Cruzeiro Esporte Clube players
AFC Ajax players
Parma Calcio 1913 players
Empoli F.C. players
Calcio Padova players
OFI Crete F.C. players
A.C. Cesena players
S.S. Virtus Lanciano 1924 players
FC Wil players
Sandefjord Fotball players
Serie A players
Serie B players
Super League Greece players
Swiss Challenge League players
Eliteserien players
Expatriate footballers in the Netherlands
Brazilian expatriate sportspeople in the Netherlands
Expatriate footballers in Italy
Brazilian expatriate sportspeople in Italy
Expatriate footballers in Greece
Brazilian expatriate sportspeople in Greece
Expatriate footballers in Switzerland
Brazilian expatriate sportspeople in Switzerland
Expatriate footballers in Norway
Brazilian expatriate sportspeople in Norway
Association football midfielders
People from Uberaba
Sportspeople from Minas Gerais